The Lotus 900 series is a family of internal combustion engines designed and built by Lotus Cars of United Kingdom. Successor to the Lotus-Ford Twin Cam, the 900 was the first complete engine developed by Lotus. The engine was built from 1972 to 1999.

Background
As early as 1964, Lotus recognized the need to find a replacement for the Lotus Twin Cam engine. Colin Chapman issued a brief that listed the features to be required in a new engine, including 'high efficiency, flexibility, torque and smoothness which was suitable for hand assembly'. Unable to find this combination in any existing engine, the company used outside consultants and internal resources to define the characteristics of the next Lotus engine. After having rejected a 120° V6 due to being too wide for Lotus' chassis and a 60° V6 as too tall for the intended bodywork, the engineers determined that a 2-litre inline-four engine was the optimal choice. This future engine would have four valves per cylinder (16 valves total) operated by belt-driven dual overhead cams and develop . The block would be angled at 45° from vertical to permit a lower bonnet and simplify development of a 4-litre V8 version for future use in Indianapolis racing.

The design team was headed by Steve Sanville, Lotus' Head of Powertrain Development, and Ron Burr, formerly of Coventry Climax. Even though the team was able to complete the design for the new cylinder head and start work on the engine block and crankshaft, it became apparent that Lotus' racing program and concurrent move to a new larger factory would limit the resources available for the new engine project.

Vauxhall
At the 1967 Earl's Court Motorshow Vauxhall unveiled their new Victor FD model. The car included an all-new Vauxhall Slant-4 engine that shared many characteristics with the engine Lotus was developing. The Vauxhall engine was an inline 4 cylinder engine with a belt-driven overhead camshaft. The block was slanted at 45° from vertical and a V8 was planned but never realised. Most importantly for Lotus, the bore centres of the Vauxhall slant-4 were the same as those Lotus had determined for the 900 series.

After seeing the new engine at the show Chapman arranged a meeting with John Alden, Vauxhall's Engineering Director, where he negotiated the purchase of ten  slant-4 blocks and four complete engines. Lotus would accelerate development of the 900 engine by using the Vauxhall iron blocks as test-beds for their new cylinder head while design of their own engine block was under way. For their test engines Lotus installed a crankshaft with a slightly longer stroke.

After it became known that Lotus was using Vauxhall's iron block in their engine development program the rumour began to circulate that the Lotus engine was based on the Vauxhall design, even through the 900 series was entirely a Lotus design.

Later Vauxhall used Lotus' cylinder head as a starting point for the design of their own DOHC cylinder head for the slant-4 block. Until that head was available some Vauxhall rally cars used the Lotus cylinder head on the slant-4 block.

Engine development
This prompted the company to split the 900 project into two versions; one with smaller ports and a 51° included angle between the valves for touring applications and one with larger ports and a 41° included angle for racing. Tony Rudd, Engineering Director for Lotus, identified the following six engine types created or planned during the early stages of development and production:

 Type 904 — Iron block 2 litre racing engine with fuel injection.
 Type 905 — Iron block 2 litre touring engine.
 Type 906 — Sand-cast aluminium block 2 litre racing engine with fuel injection. 
 Type 907 — Die cast aluminium 2 litre touring engine.
 Type 908 — Aluminium 4 litre racing engine.
 Type 909 — Aluminium 4 litre touring engine.

Early testing of the type 904 engine did not reveal any fundamental deficiencies, although problems with the horizontally-mounted distributor vibrating and the timing belt jumping off the inlet cam were identified. The Vauxhall blocks developed cracks around their main bearing bolt bosses, so a special batch were made with thicker castings. This change was applied to all subsequent slant-4 blocks.

The 905 engine experienced wear on the connecting rod against the crankshaft webs, which was solved by boring rather than honing the bushing on the small end of the con-rod so that it held more oil. Vibration problems with the distributor, mounted vertically on the 905, appeared on this engine as well, and it was found that a larger battery was needed to start the larger engine. Mechanical noise from the engine and noise from the air intake were excessive. 

Lotus invested £550,000 in a new machining facility for the new engine, and a series of changes were made to the design to adapt it to the numerically-controlled milling machines. One change was to split the case along the crankshaft centre-line and incorporate a separate one-piece bearing cap and engine skirt girdle. This change eliminated the need to machine deep main bearing saddles and restored some stiffness to the block assembly. The camshaft housings were kept separate from the cylinder head assembly, which simplified machining operations.

Development of the touring engine diverged into a version for the United States and another for the home market and the rest of the world. The main differences were in the carburettors used and compression ratios. Engines for the US received Zenith-Stromberg carburettors and an 8.4:1 compression ratio due to emissions requirements and California law penalizing engines with ratios above 8.5:1. Engines destined for the UK and Europe had Dell'Orto carburettors and a 9.5:1 compression ratio. Pistons for UK and European engines were flat-topped and fly-cut for valve relief, while Federal engines had an additional indentation milled out of the centre of the piston top.

Twelve sand-cast aluminium engines were made and installed in the test fleet vehicles, which were joined by a Bedford CF van that continued to be used for deliveries while testing the engine. The alloy blocks were mechanically noisier than the iron engines. Another issue was that the alloy blocks used wet liners which were poorly supported in the initial design and this caused a high rate of cylinder head joint failures. This was dealt with by increasing the torque loading on the studs and increasing the thickness of the liners. An electrolytic corrosion issue was dealt with by changing to a stainless steel gasket and using a chemically inhibited coolant. The engine tended to show low oil pressure at idle which, while not dangerous, was expected to worry car owners and was solved by installing an oversized oil pump.
 
While preparing engines for Jensen other problems came to light. Transmission vibration thought to be caused by insufficient beam stiffness in the engine/transmission assembly was addressed by adding two lugs to the lower edge of the crankcase. Two oil-related problems surfaced. The first was oil being introduced into the air box during sustained high-speed cruising. An external oil-separating breather was added until the housing for the rubber-lip crankshaft seal could be re-shaped into an oil-separator chamber, which became the permanent solution. The other problem, which was seen under similar conditions, was that the oil pressure would drop precipitously. This was caused by oil being held up in the cam boxes and not draining back into the sump. This was due to mismatched drain holes, casting flash, and sticking or incorrect relief valves. The short-term solution was to phosphate the camshafts, and the other causes were dealt with as assembly problems.

Jensen-Healey
The engine was complete by 1970, but Lotus' existing cars could not be adapted to use the new engine, and Project M50 would not become the Elite Type 75 for several more years. At the same time Norwegian-American businessman Kjell Qvale had taken a controlling interest in Jensen Motors and teamed up with Donald Healey of Austin-Healey fame and his son Geoffrey Healey to design a car to be called the Jensen-Healey, using Vauxhall Viva GT components. They were looking for a suitable engine for the car, having decided that the Vauxhall slant-4 would not be powerful enough after being certified for US emissions.

Chapman approached Qvale and offered to supply Jensen with 60 of the new 900 series engines per week. This initial offer was declined but, after a second offer by Chapman, in October 1971 Jensen announced that they would be using up to 15,000 Lotus 907 engines per year in the Jensen-Healey.

The 900 series engine first appeared in production form as the 907 with the March 1972 debut of the Jensen-Healey. It was the first mass-produced multi-valve engine available to the general public, appearing one year before the 16-valve SOHC Triumph Dolomite Sprint and three years before the 16-valve DOHC Chevrolet Cosworth Vega.

The engine in the Jensen-Healey experienced a series of problems. In addition to a high rate of oil consumption, distorted cylinder liners occurred. An updated Jensen-Healey Mk2 was introduced late in 1973 with a revised engine having a redesigned crankcase, but by this time the car had already acquired a reputation for poor reliability and sales never reached expected levels. Production of the Jensen-Healey ended in 1976, but by this time Lotus was using the type 907 in their own cars.

Chrysler/Talbot
In 1977, Desmond "Des" O'Dell, Director of Motorsport for Chrysler UK, approached Chapman about having Lotus supply a 900 series engine for a special project. O'Dell wanted to develop a rally version of the Chrysler Sunbeam to take up the competition role formerly filled by the Chrysler Avenger. It would be competing against the then-dominant Ford Escorts.

Tony Rudd developed a flexible flywheel to dampen increased vibrations from the larger size. This engine was called the type 911. In 1978 Chrysler sold their European operations to the PSA Group, so when car the car debuted in 1979 it was called the Talbot Sunbeam-Lotus. Ultimately 2,298 road-car versions were sold.

Driver Henri Toivonen won the RAC Rally in 1980, and teammates Guy Frequelin and Russel Brookes were third and fourth. The next year, the car won the Argentine Rally and placed second at Monte Carlo, Portugal, Corsica, Brazil and San Remo, winning the 1981 Championship of Makes for Talbot and earning Frequelin second place in the Drivers series.

Work began on a Group B Talbot Horizon as a possible successor to the Talbot Sunbeam-Lotus. This car had the same type 911 engine but instead of the front-engine, rear-wheel-drive layout of the earlier car the new car adopted a rear mid-engine, rear-wheel-drive layout. Only two prototypes were built before the project was cancelled due to PSA favouring development of the four-wheel drive Peugeot 205 Turbo 16.

900 series engine models

Type 904
The type 904 engine was used by Lotus in two Type 62 cars which raced for one year in 1969 and were then sold. This hybrid engine used a Vauxhall Slant-4 iron block and the Lotus DOHC aluminium cylinder head with Tecalemit-Jackson fuel injection. The engine was available under two marketing designations; LV220 and LV240, where "LV" stood for Lotus/Vauxhall and 220 and 240 stood for the power developed by the respective versions. 

Bill Blydenstein, the Team Manager for Dealer Team Vauxhall (DTV), acquired several Lotus heads and other parts to build LV/240 engines for use in DTV's rally cars, including the famous "Old Nail" Firenza among others.

Vauxhall later went racing in Group 4 with the Vauxhall Chevette HS. The road-going versions used the Vauxhall DOHC cylinder head but early rally cars used the Lotus head on a 2,300 cc block. These early HS models were homologated with the Lotus head in November 1976 before the requisite 400 cars had been built. A rule change in 1978 by FISA made the Lotus-head cars ineligible to compete and Vauxhall switched to their own DOHC head.

The 904 LV/220 and LV/240 also appeared in Daren Cars' Mk3 in the early 1970s.

Applications:
 1969 Lotus 62
 1971 Vauxhall Firenza (`Old Nail' rally car - received engine in 1973)
 1976 Vauxhall Chevette HS (rally version)
 1971-73 Daren Cars Mk3

Type 905
The type 905 engine was first run on a test-bed for the production road-car engine and was later installed in the test vehicles prior to the arrival of the first batch of aluminium blocks.

Applications:
 1967 Vauxhall Victor (test vehicle)
 1968 Vauxhall Viva GT (test vehicle)
 1969 Bedford CF (test vehicle)

Type 906
The type 906 engine had a sand-cast version of Lotus' new aluminium block and Tecalemit-Jackson mechanical fuel injection. It was used in a Formula 2 open-wheeled car that had the same "Type 74" designation as the Lotus Europa Twin-Cam and was commonly called the `Texaco Star'.

Applications:
 1973 Type 74 TS

Type 907

The type 907 was the first version of the 900 series to go into full production when it appeared in the Jensen-Healey in 1972. It began to appear in Lotus cars in 1975 in the Lotus Elite and was later used in the Eclat and Esprit. The angle between intake and exhaust valves was 38°. Ignition on early engines was provided by a Lucas points and coil system, which was replaced by a Lumenition system on later engines. The 907 (and the subsequent 912) were offered in several levels of tune, called `specs', that ranged from 1 to 10 with different compression ratios and power outputs.

Even though they produced respectable power for their size and era, early 907s earned the nickname "the torqueless wonder" for their lack of bottom-end torque.

Applications:
 1972-1976 Jensen-Healey
 1975-1976 Jensen GT
 1974-1980 Lotus Elite S1 (Type 75)
 1975-1985 Lotus Eclat S1 (Type 76)
 1975-1978 Lotus Esprit S1
 1978-1981 Lotus Esprit S2

Type 909
While this 900 variant was mentioned in Rudd's original paper it only appeared in the Lotus Etna concept car that debuted at the Birmingham Motorshow of 1984. Power and torque were reported to be  and  respectively.

Applications:
 1984 Lotus Etna

Type 911
This enlarged 900 variant was designed by Lotus for Chrysler (later Talbot) and their Lotus Talbot Sunbeam rally and production cars.

Applications:
 1979 - 1981 Talbot Lotus Sunbeam
 1982 Talbot Lotus Horizon (2 prototypes)

Type 912
The type 912 was a four-cylinder naturally aspirated engine that Lotus began to use in their cars in 1980. The 912 shared its bore, stroke and  displacement with the type 911 but had many internal enhancements, including redesigned camshafts, camshaft carriers and cam covers as well as a new sump, cylinder head and main bearing girdle.

In October 1985 a high compression version of the 912 was introduced. The compression ratio was raised to 10.9:1, and the engine also received revised ports, new camshafts, new Mahle pistons and alloy cylinder liners with a Nikasil coating. Externally there were new cam covers with red paint.

Applications:
 1981 Lotus Esprit S2.2
 1981-1990 Lotus Esprit S3 and Normally Aspirated (X180 generation)
 1981 Lotus Eclat S2.2
 1982 Lotus Excel
 1986 Lotus Excel SE and SA

Type 910 and 910S
The type 910 was a turbocharged engine introduced in the 1980 Esprit Essex. Esprit development engineer Mike Kimberley and Turbo engine project manager Graham Atkin convinced Chapman to focus on maximizing torque at low engine speeds.

The compression ratio for the turbo engine was lowered from the 9.4:1 of the naturally aspirated engines to 7.5:1 by lowering the piston crowns and rings relative to the gudgeon pins. New camshafts that increased both lift and duration were added, as were sodium-filled exhaust valves and larger water passages in the cylinder head. The lower main-bearing girdle was made stronger. The installation included a larger radiator and higher-capacity water pump. A dry-sump system was fitted along with an additional scavenge pump and an oil cooler. The engine reverted to a wet-sump system in 1982.

Lotus kept the dual Dell'Orto 40 DHLA carburetors used on the non-turbo engines but opted to have the turbocharger blow through the carburetors, which necessitated pressure seals on the throttle spindles to prevent leaks in the pressurized air-fuel system.

In 1985 a "High Compression" (HC) version was released with new Mahle pistons. Carburettors still delivered the air/fuel mix but they were now the larger Dell'Orto DHLA 45M model. In markets with stringent emissions requirements the 910 became the first 900 series engine to use fuel injection with the addition of a Bosch KE-Jetronic system in 1986. In mid-1989 the Bosch system was replaced by Delco GMP4 electronic fuel injection that included a crank-fired wasted spark ignition that eliminated the need for a distributor.

In 1990 the engine was upgraded with an air-water-air intercooler that Lotus called a Chargecooler to become the type 910S.

The engine in the Sport 300, X180R and S4s used a new cylinder head cast by Zeus Aluminium Products and commonly known as the Zeus head. The revised head came with enlarged inlet valves and used a reprogrammed engine control module.

The type 910S was used in the limited-production Brazilian Emme Lotus 422T 4-door sedan from 1997 to 1999.

Applications:
 1980-1990 Lotus Esprit Essex (S2 generation) and Turbo (S3 generation) and Turbo (X180 generation) 
 1991 Lotus Esprit S
 1990-1993 Lotus Esprit SE
 1993 Lotus Esprit Sport 300 and X180R
 1993-1996 Lotus Esprit S4
 1995-1996 Lotus Esprit S4s
 1997-1999 Emme Lotus 422T

Type 920
Although not significantly larger than the 907, with a bore and stroke of  it was slightly undersquare, in contrast to the oversquare 907. The 920 was originally exclusive to the Italian market, where cars with engines smaller than 2.0 L fall into a lower tax regime. It would later be available in Portugal and Greece as well. The 920 was used from 1996 to 1999 in the Esprit GT3, with the improvements from the SE models. This was the last iteration of the 4-cylinder 900 series Lotus engine, which had a lifespan of nearly 30 years.

Applications:
 1991-1992 Lotus Esprit (Italy only)
 1996 Lotus Esprit S4 (VIN 42046, 42051 two (I am not sure) of three finally built)
 1996-1999 Lotus Esprit GT3

Type 918
The type 918 is a 3.5-liter DOHC, 4 valves per cylinder V8 engine with a flat-plane crankshaft. Although it carries a 9xx designation it is described as a clean sheet design.

Applications:
 1996-2004 Lotus Esprit V8
 1996 Lotus Esprit GT1

Engine comparison table

References

Further reading 
 
 
 
 
 
 

Lotus engines
Gasoline engines by model
Straight-four engines
V8 engines